Feduniak is a surname. Notable people with the surname include:

Bob Feduniak, American poker player, husband of Maureen
Maureen Feduniak, American poker player
Michael Feduniak (1914–1989), Canadian businessman and politician